Friedrich Eduard Maria Demmer (17 April 1911 – 29 January 1966) was an Austrian ice hockey player who competed for the Austrian national team at the 1936 Winter Olympics in Garmisch-Partenkirchen and the 1948 Winter Olympics in Saint-Moritz. Demmer played 12 games at the two Olympics, scoring a total of six goals.

He also made 54 appearances for the Austrian national team at the World Championships between 1930 and 1949. Demmer was a top offensive threat on the team, scoring 31 goals in his World Championship career. He played club hockey for Wiener EV in the Austrian Hockey Championship.

References

External links
 

1911 births
1966 deaths
Austrian ice hockey left wingers
Ice hockey people from Vienna
Ice hockey players at the 1936 Winter Olympics
Ice hockey players at the 1948 Winter Olympics
Olympic ice hockey players of Austria
Wiener EV players